The pancreatic notch is a separation between the neck of pancreas and the uncinate process of pancreas.

References

External links

Pancreas anatomy